Lorabela is a genus of sea snails, marine gastropod mollusks in the family Mangeliidae.

Species
Species within the genus Lorabela include:
 Lorabela davisi (Hedley, 1916)
 Lorabela glacialis (Thiele, 1912)
 Lorabela pelseneeri (Strebel, 1908)
 Lorabela plicatula (Thiele, 1912)
Species brought into synonymy
 Lorabela bathybia (Strebel, 1908): synonym of Pleurotomella bathybia Strebel, 1908
 Lorabela notophila (Strebel, 1908): synonym of Strebela notophila (Strebel, 1908)

References

External links
 Bouchet, P.; Kantor, Y. I.; Sysoev, A.; Puillandre, N. (2011). A new operational classification of the Conoidea. Journal of Molluscan Studies. 77, 273-308
  Tucker, J.K. 2004 Catalog of recent and fossil turrids (Mollusca: Gastropoda). Zootaxa 682:1-1295.
 Worldwide Mollusk Data base : Mangeliidae
 Kantor Y.I., Harasewych M.G. & Puillandre N. (2016). A critical review of Antarctic Conoidea (Neogastropoda). Molluscan Research. 36(3): 153-206

 
Gastropod genera